Vernon Douglas Mott (born March 26, 1957) is a Canadian-born Norwegian former ice hockey player. He was born in Fillmore, Saskatchewan, and played for the club IF Frisk Asker and he also played for Viking Hockey). He played for the Norwegian national ice hockey team at the 1988 Winter Olympics. He played 12 official national team matches for Norway.

References

1957 births
Living people
Ice hockey people from Saskatchewan
Ice hockey players at the 1988 Winter Olympics
Norwegian ice hockey players
Olympic ice hockey players of Norway
Colorado College Tigers men's ice hockey players